Abgar II was the Abgarid king of Osroene from 68 to 53 BC. Plutarch describes Abgar as a chief of the Arabs.

In 64 BC, he sided with the Romans helping Pompey's legate Lucius Afranius when the latter occupied northern Mesopotamia.  However, it was alleged that in 53 BC he helped to betray Marcus Crassus by leading him out onto an open plain resulting in the Battle of Carrhae against the Parthians, which led to the destruction an entire Roman army. What is certain is that he gained no benefits from the battle since, shortly afterwards, he was deposed by Orodes II in a move which strengthened Parthian control over the region.

References

Sources 
 
 
 
 

1st-century BC rulers in Asia
1st-century BC Arabs
Place of birth unknown
Year of birth missing
Year of death missing
Kings of Osroene